Ashleigh Barty defeated Jil Teichmann in the final, 6–3, 6–1, to win the women's singles title at the 2021 Cincinnati Masters and her first title at the tournament. Barty won the title without dropping a set. It was her fifth and last title of the season, her third WTA 1000 title, and her 13th career singles title overall on the WTA Tour.

Victoria Azarenka was the defending champion, but lost in the third round to Barty.

Angelique Kerber contested her 1000th match in her professional career in the quarterfinals against Petra Kvitová; she won the match after Kvitová retired.

This was the final tournament in which former world No. 4 and British No. 1 Johanna Konta competed before her retirement. She was defeated in the first round by Karolína Muchová.

Seeds
The top eight seeds received a bye into the second round.

Draw

Finals

Top half

Section 1

Section 2

Bottom half

Section 3

Section 4

Qualifying

Seeds

Qualifiers

Lucky loser

Draw

First qualifier

Second qualifier

Third qualifier

Fourth qualifier

Fifth qualifier

Sixth qualifier

Seventh qualifier

Eighth qualifier

References

External links
Main draw
Qualifying draw

Women's Singles